Ilkka Nummisto (April 24, 1944 – June 29, 2019) was a Finnish sprint canoer who competed from the mid-1960s to the mid-1970s. Competing in four Summer Olympics, he earned his best finish of fifth in the K-4 1000 m event at Mexico City in 1968.

After his Olympic career concluded, Nummisto appeared in the Finals of the World's Strongest Man competition 5 times between 1986 and 1992, including a personal best 3rd place showing in 1990. He was the first man to lift all five McGlashen stones in The World's Strongest Man, followed by Geoff Capes and Jon Pall Sigmarson at the same event in 1986. Ilkka was also 3 times Finland's Strongest Man.

Olympic games

Standings

References

1944 births
2019 deaths
Canoeists at the 1964 Summer Olympics
Canoeists at the 1968 Summer Olympics
Canoeists at the 1972 Summer Olympics
Canoeists at the 1976 Summer Olympics
Finnish male canoeists
Olympic canoeists of Finland
Finnish strength athletes